Pietro Tenerani (11 November 1789 – 16 December 1869) was an Italian sculptor of the Neoclassic style.

Biography

He was born in Torano, near Carrara. He initially trained with his maternal uncle, the sculptor Pietro Marchetti, and in 1813, obtained a stipend to study in Rome. There he studied mainly in the studio of Bertel Thorvaldsen. In 1816, he sculpted an Abandoned Psyche sold to Marchesa Lenzoni of Florence.

He was prolific and worked in a chaste neoclassical style into the mid-nineteenth century, specialising in pious subjects. His most prominent commission was for the tomb of Pope Pius VIII in Rome. He completed a colossal statue of St Alfonso de Liguori for the Vatican. He sculpted a St John the Evangelist for the church of San Francesco di Paola in Naples, and of San Benedetto in the Basilica Ostiense. He made numerous busts of officials in the state and church, including Popes Pius VIII, Gregory XVI, and Pius IX.

He depicted the Count Esterhazy and his daughter Karoly. He completed a bas-relief for the Monument to Alberto Mattioli, designed by Luigi Poletti, for the church of Sant'Agostino in Rimini. He sculpted a bust of Pellegrino Rossi, the ill-fated minister of Pius IX, and of Carlota of Mexico, former empress, and widow of Maximilian. He sculpted a public statue of Simon Bolivar for Plaza de Bolivar in Bogota, and a bronze statue of Ferdinand II of Naples for the city of Messina in Sicily. In Hungary, he sculpted a monument to Foth for the Karoly chapel. 

His son  became an architect. He was buried in the Church of Santa Maria degli Angeli alle Terme Diocleziane.<ref>artistica: pubblicazione mensile, illustrata], Volume 1, Number 7, By Gaetanno Giucci, Editor, Raffaello Ojetti, 1872, page 49-54</ref>

References

Further reading
Iconographic encyclopaedia of the arts and sciences, Volume 3 By Johann Georg Heck, Philadelphia, 1885, page 153.
 Stefano Grandesso, Pietro Tenerani (1789-1869)'', Silvana Editoriale, Cinisello Balsamo, 2003,  ([https://books.google.com/books?id=ZbBKAQAAIAAJ Google Books)

External links

19th-century Italian sculptors
Italian male sculptors
Neoclassical sculptors
1789 births
1869 deaths
People from the Province of Massa-Carrara
Recipients of the Pour le Mérite (civil class)
Catholic sculptors
19th-century Italian male artists